Kilkerran railway station served an area of rural Ayrshire, Scotland from 1860 to 1965 on the Maybole and Girvan Railway.

History 
The station opened on 24 May 1860 by the Maybole and Girvan Railway. The station closed to both passengers and goods traffic on 6 September 1965.

References

External links 

Disused railway stations in South Ayrshire
Railway stations in Great Britain opened in 1860
Railway stations in Great Britain closed in 1965
Beeching closures in Scotland
Former Glasgow and South Western Railway stations